Craon is a commune in the Mayenne department in north-western France.

Geography

The river Oudon flows through the middle of the commune and through the town of Craon.

Monuments 
Craon is home to the 18th century .

Gallery

See also
Communes of the Mayenne department

References

External links

Communes of Mayenne
Anjou